The posterior median line is a sagittal line on the posterior torso at the midline.

A similar term is "vertebral line", which defined by the spinous processes. However, this term is not in Terminologia Anatomica.

References

Anatomy